Tom Shipley (born 1953) is the Iowa State Senator from the 9th District. A Republican, he has served in the Iowa Senate since 2015. He currently resides in Corning, Iowa.

As of February 2020, Shipley serves on the following committees: Natural Resources and Environment (Vice Chair)), Agriculture, Appropriations, Judiciary, and Transportation. He also serves on the Agriculture and Natural Resources Appropriations Subcommittee (Chair), as well as the Iowa Commission on Interstate Cooperation.

Shipley was elected in 2014 with 17,681 votes, running unopposed.

References

External links 
Senator Tom Shipley official Iowa Legislature site
Senator Tom Shipley at Iowa Senate Republican Caucus

Republican Party Iowa state senators
Living people
Iowa State University alumni
21st-century American politicians
People from Corning, Iowa
1953 births